Lalitpur Power Generation Company Limited  is a coal-based thermal power plant located in Mahroni Tehsil in Lalitpur district, Uttar Pradesh. The power plant is owned by Bajaj Hindusthan Limited. Bharat Heavy Electricals is executing the project.

Capacity
The planned capacity of the power plant in 1980 MW.

References

Coal-fired power stations in Uttar Pradesh
Lalitpur district, India
2015 establishments in Uttar Pradesh
Energy infrastructure completed in 2015